The Hartford Blues of the National Football League played only in the 1926 NFL season, with a record of 3–7. The team was based in Hartford, Connecticut but played at the East Hartford Velodrome.

Hall of Famers

Season-by-season

References

Complete Football Records

 
American football teams in Connecticut
American football teams established in 1924
American football teams disestablished in 1927
Defunct National Football League teams
Defunct sports teams in Connecticut
Blues
East Hartford, Connecticut
1924 establishments in Connecticut
1927 disestablishments in Connecticut